Manuel I, surnamed Karantenos/Sarantenos or Charitopoulos, (? – May or June 1222) was Patriarch of Constantinople from December 1216 or January 1217 to 1222. He seems to have been called "the Philosopher": George Akropolites says he was "a philosopher, it seems, in deed, and so named by the people." Manuel was Patriarch-in-exile as at the time his titular seat was occupied by the Latin Patriarch of Constantinople, and he lived in Nicaea.  Before the sack of 1204, Manuel was a deacon and hypatos ton philosophon in Constantinople.  This is likely the source of his epithet "the Philosopher".

Under Manuel I, Saint Sava had become an archbishop and an autocephalous Serbian Orthodox Church was formed in the territory of the Serbian Kingdom of Stefan Nemanjić.

Manuel is noted for his role in a diplomatic interplay between the Nicaean emperor Theodore I Laskaris and the Latin Emperor of Constantinople, Robert of Courtenay, in 1222. Robert had approached Theodore for a peace treaty and the latter offered his daughter Eudokia in marriage to cement the deal.  But Theodore had married Maria of Courtenay, Robert's sister, in 1217. Manuel is thus reported by George Akropolites to have blocked the betrothal, twice negotiated, on religious-legal grounds: Robert, Theodore's brother-in-law, could not also become his son-in-law as this was an 'illegal union' and constituted incest as it was within the third degree of kinship.

References

13th-century patriarchs of Constantinople
People of the Empire of Nicaea
1222 deaths